Paul Poisson may refer to:
Paul Poisson (actor), French actor
Paul Poisson (politician) (1887–1982), Canadian politician